The 1933 Sam Houston State Bearkats football team represented Sam Houston State Teachers College (now known as Sam Houston State University) as a member of the Lone Star Conference (LSC) during the 1933 college football season. Led by 11th-year head coach J. W. Jones, the Bearkats compiled an overall record of 3–4–2 with a mark of 1–2–2 in conference play, and finished fourth in the LSC.

Schedule

References

Sam Houston State
Sam Houston Bearkats football seasons
Sam Houston State Bearkats football